John Wesley Dorsey, Jr. (June 13, 1936 – July 28, 2014) served as the acting President of the University of Maryland, College Park from 1974 to 1975 and as the acting chancellor of the university from August 1974 to June 1975.

Biography
Dorsey was born in Maryland in 1936 and graduated from the University of Maryland with a B.S. in economics in 1958. He continued to attend graduate school at Harvard University receiving an M.A. in 1962 and a Ph.D. in economics in 1964 and later receiving a certificate from the London School of Economics. Dorsey started teaching at College Park as an assistant professor in 1963 and became director of the Bureau of Business and Economic Research in 1966. Dorsey served as the vice chancellor for administrative affairs from 1970 to 1977, and then became the chancellor of the University of Maryland, Baltimore County. From 1986 to 1989, he was Special Assistant to the President of the university. In 1989, he returned to the Department of Economics at the University of Maryland from which he retired as an emeritus professor in 2001. Dorsey has worked as a SECU Board member since 1975, serving as chairman for four years and as Vice Chairman for six years. He died of respiratory failure on July 28, 2014.

References 

Records of the Office of the President, University of Maryland

University of Maryland, College Park alumni
Presidents of the University of Maryland, College Park
Presidents of the University of Maryland, Baltimore County
Harvard Graduate School of Arts and Sciences alumni
1936 births
2014 deaths